Pará Province was one of the provinces of the Empire of Brazil. It was created in 1850 from territory of Grão-Pará Province.

In 1889 it became the state of Pará.

Provinces of Brazil